"34+35" (pronounced "thirty-four thirty-five") is a song recorded by American singer Ariana Grande, included as the second track on her sixth studio album, Positions (2020). It was written by Grande, Albert Stanaj, Courageous Xavier Herrera, Scott Nicholson, Steven Franks, Tayla Parx, Victoria Monét, and its producers Peter Lee Johnson and Tommy Brown. The song was released through Republic Records on November 3, 2020, serving as the second official single from Positions. The song's title and chorus reference the 69 sex position, while the rest of its lyrics feature several sexual puns, double entendres, and sex jokes.

"34+35" debuted at number eight on the US Billboard Hot 100, becoming Grande's 18th top ten single. The song later rose to reach a peak of number two following the release of the remix. It also debuted at number five on the Billboard Global 200, becoming Grande's second top ten single on the chart; it later reached a peak of number two there. Additionally, "34+35" peaked within the top ten in Australia, Canada, Ireland, Malaysia, Singapore and the United Kingdom, giving Grande her 19th top ten single in the latter.

Its music video, directed by Director X, premiered on November 17, 2020. A remix of the song, featuring American rappers Doja Cat and Megan Thee Stallion, was released on January 15, 2021. A live performance music video of "34+35" was released on July 15, 2021.

Background and promotion

"34+35" was first revealed when Grande announced the track list of Positions via social media on October 24, 2020. Grande started working on the song in 2019, and finished it in September 2020 after she decided it was going to be on the album. It was originally intended to be the lead single of the album before being replaced by title track "Positions", after Grande decided that it was more appropriate as it gave a more accurate representation of the album. Given the explicit nature of the song, which has been compared to Grande's past works such as "Side to Side" and "Dangerous Woman", Grande said that she was "very nervous" about the song initially, fearing that it would "distract from the vulnerability and the sweetness that is the rest of the album". She stated that it was sonically "one of [her] favorite things [she and her team have] ever done", adding: "it deserve[d] a home on the album for sure...I think that everything I do has a little bit of humor, and the people know that I'm not really sitting here 'til dawn."

To promote the song, Grande released a "34+35 dad hat" on her official merchandise store, which features "34+35" graphics embroidered on the front of a baseball cap. "34+35" was sent to contemporary hit radio in Australia and the United States on October 30 and November 3, 2020, respectively. It was later sent to hot adult contemporary radio on January 19, 2021. A lyric video was released on YouTube on October 30, 2020.

Composition
"34+35" is an uptempo pop song with influences of R&B and an instrumentation utilizing violins, plucked strings, and elements of trap music. The song is written with a tempo of 110 beats per minute in the key of F major, while Grande's vocals range from a low note of G3 to a high note of F5. The song's lyrics include sexual puns, double entendres, and sex jokes, while the song's title (which, as a mathematical expression, evaluates to 69) and chorus reference to the 69 sex position, with the outro's lyrics including "Means I wanna 69 witcha". Other lyrics include explicit sexual references, such as "Can you stay up all night?/Fuck me 'til the daylight". The song was written about Grande's sex life with her boyfriend Dalton Gomez. According to Grande, the line, "Just gimme them babies" was suggested by songwriter Scott Nicholson as a joke to complete the first verse, on the night they started writing the song, but she liked it so much that it ended up in the final version. The earthquake referenced in the third verse ("Got the neighbours yellin' "Earthquake!"/4.5 when I make the bed shake") was based on an actual earthquake of magnitude 4.5 that occurred in Southern California in September 2020. Grande wrote the bridge together with songwriters Tayla Parx and Victoria Monét. 

Mary Siroky of Consequence of Sound called the track "overwhelmingly playful" and "no-holds-barred", with Heather Taylor-Singh of Exclaim! writing that it featured an "overt sexiness". Adam White of The Independent called the song's lyrics "dirty-minded" and "cutely tongue-in-cheek", while Brenton Blanchet of Clash regarded "34+35" as "Grande's most sexually explicit track yet". Similarly, Natalie Morin of Refinery29 named the song "Grande's sex magnum opus".

Critical reception
On his ranking of every song on Positions, where "34+35" was positioned at number two, Jason Lipshutz of Billboard praised Grande for being one of the "few artists working today [who] could release an explicit sex track that sounds this luxurious and ornately detailed", describing the song as "unapologetic and dizzyingly fun, with Grande shrugging off the need for euphemism and rightfully confident in her approach". Writing for The Line of Best Fit, Ross Horton identified "34+35" as the best song on and the "mission statement" for the album, writing that "the amount of puns, double entendres and jokes littered throughout is staggering". Brenton Blanchet of Clash wrote that the song "hits just as hard as its lyrical prowess", calling it the "baby-making-ist track" on Positions and referring to its "NSFW" chorus as "addictive".

Varietys Chris Willman remarked that "34+35" was "a little bit on the schoolgirl-sniggering side" and that the outro's literalization of the song's 69 joke was "unnecessary". Shaad D'Souza of The Fader referred to the song as a "hammy ode to 69-ing" which "makes no attempts at even the most vaguely clever innuendo". Slant Magazines Alexa Camp considered the song's lyrics "a lot of empty pillow talk and plentiful dog whistles." Emma Madden of Entertainment Weekly criticized the song's lyrics, writing, "Grande sings that she was 'never good' in math class on '34+35,' and it seems she might be equally bad at math-related wordplay."

Year-end lists
Uproxx ranked "34+35" as the 9th best song of 2020, with Caitlin White commenting that the song is more carefree and funnier than the lead single "Positions", and that it "has all the makings of a late album hit, and will go down in Ari's catalogue as one of her most clever offerings". LaTesha Harris from NPR ranked "34+35" as the 8th best song of 2020. Tidal ranked "34+35" as the 32nd best pop song of 2020. Jessica McKinney of Complex ranked "34+35" as the 42nd best song of 2020. Calling its production "immaculate", she commented that the song is "sexually explicit, seductive, luxurious, and elegant, guided by Grande's sultry vocals".

Accolades

Commercial performance

United States
Following the release of Positions, "34+35" debuted at number eight on the US Billboard Hot 100 chart issue dated November 14, 2020, drawing in 21.7 million streams, 5.7 million airplay audience impressions and 3,000 digital downloads sold within its first tracking week. It became Grande's eighteenth top ten single, tying her with Beyoncé for the eighth-most among women in the chart's 62-year history. Since earning her first top 10 hit with "The Way" in April 2013, no other female artist has earned as many Hot 100 top ten hits as Grande. "34+35" also debuted at number five on the Billboard Global 200 chart issue dated November 9, 2020, becoming Grande's second top ten hit. With the help of "34+35" and "Positions", the latter of which was at number one, Grande became the first woman, and third artist overall, joining Justin Bieber and BTS, with two top five hits apiece on the Global 200 so far.

Following the release of its remix, "34+35" soared to a new peak of number two on the Hot 100, blocked from the top spot by Olivia Rodrigo's "Drivers License", lodging over 24.2 million on-demand streams and 8,000 digital downloads, thus marking Grande's twelfth top 5 hit on the Hot 100, and the second track off of Positions to do so. "34+35" also marked the highest-charting song credited to three or more female soloists on the Hot 100 since Christina Aguilera, Mýa, Pink and Lil' Kim's "Lady Marmalade" in 2001. Additionally, it also reached a new peak of number two on the Billboard Global 200 chart and entered the Global 200 Excl. U.S. chart for the first time at number five, becoming Grande's third top ten hit on the chart. Following the release of the music video of the remix, "34+35" re-peaked at number two on the chart dated February 27, 2021, drawing in 18.1 million streams, 60.2 million airplay audience impressions and 16,000 digital downloads sold within its 16th tracking week. This time Grande was solely credited on the chart.

On the US Billboard Mainstream Top 40 airplay chart, "34+35" peaked at number one on the issue dated February 13, 2021, becoming the second consecutive chart topper from the parent album Positions and earning Grande her eighth number one single and 18th overall top ten single. It replaced Grande's own "Positions" which dominated the chart for seven consecutive weeks, making Grande the first artist to succeed herself at number one as the only act credited on both tracks. Joining Mariah Carey, Outkast, Iggy Azalea and Halsey, Grande also became just the fifth artist in Billboard history to replace themselves on the Pop Songs airplay chart. It remained at number one for a second consecutive week. The same week Grande simultaneously occupied the top two of pop airplay chart with "34+35" and "Positions", making Grande the first artist to simultaneously occupy the top two with two solo songs. Joining Mariah Carey, Outkast, Pharrell Williams, Iggy Azalea and Halsey, Grande also became just the sixth artist in Billboard history to simultaneously occupy the entire top two of Pop Songs airplay chart. It remained at number one for three consecutive weeks. It also peaked at number one on the Billboard Rhythmic Top 40 airplay chart on the issue dated March 13, 2021, becoming Grande's third number one hit and 13th overall top ten single on the rhythmic airplay chart.

On April 6, 2021, "34+35" was certified double platinum by the Recording Industry Association of America (RIAA) for moving 2 million units in the United States.

Other territories
In Canada, "34+35" entered the Canadian Hot 100 chart at number eight on the issue dated November 14, 2020, becoming Grande's 18th top ten single in the country. Following the release of the remix featuring Doja Cat and Megan Thee Stallion,  "34+35" reached a peak of number five on the issue dated January 30, 2021, becoming the second top five hit from the parent album Positions.

In the United Kingdom, "34+35" debuted at number nine on the UK Singles Chart on the week ending November 12, 2020, becoming Grande's 19th top ten entry in Britain. It rebounded to a new peak of number eight on the week ending January 14, 2021. Following the release of the remix featuring Doja Cat and Megan Thee Stallion,  "34+35" reached a peak of number three on the week ending January 28, 2021, becoming Grande's 15th top five hit in the United Kingdom. On October 15, 2021, "34+35" was certified Platinum by the British Phonographic Industry (BPI) for moving 600,000 units in the United Kingdom. In Ireland, "34+35" debuted at number four on the Irish Singles Chart, becoming Grande's 18th top ten single in the country.

"34+35" also achieved success in Oceania; the song debuted at number nine on the ARIA Singles Chart, earning Grande her 17th top ten single in the country. Following the release of the remix featuring Doja Cat and Megan Thee Stallion, "34+35" reached a new peak of number five on the ARIA Singles Chart, becoming the second top five hit from Positions after the title track which debuted and peaked at number one. In New Zealand, "34+35" peaked at number three on the New Zealand Singles Chart chart issue dated January 25, 2021.

Music video
A music video directed by Director X was released on November 17, 2020, on Grande's YouTube channel. The video premiered at 9 am PST. The video starts with Grande in a lab, wearing a lab coat. She can be seen scribbling notes and maneuvering machinery. Grande also studies a robot version of herself and struggles to make the robot come to life. After many attempts, the robot awakens and transforms all of the scientists' clothes into nightgowns reminiscent of fembots
as they all start dancing. The video is also interspersed with scenes of Grande and her dancers dancing and posing in a white room with projecting black polka dots.  The music video contains references to the 1927 movie Metropolis.

Nylon named "34+35" music video as one of the most memorable music videos of 2020.

Credits and personnel
Credits adapted from Tidal and the liner notes of Positions.

Personnel
 Ariana Grande – vocals, background vocals, vocal production, vocal arrangement, audio engineering
 Tommy Brown – production
 Steven Franks – co-production
 Peter Lee Johnson – production, strings
 Courageous Xavier Herrera – co-production
 Billy Hickey – audio engineering
 Şerban Ghenea – mixing
 Randy Merrill – mastering

Recording
 Recorded at Champagne Therapy Studios (Los Angeles, California)
 Mixed at MixStar Studios (Virginia Beach, Virginia)
 Mastered at Sterling Sound (New York, New York)

Notes
 Physical releases of Positions credit Grande, Nicholson, Monét and Parx for "lyrics and melodies".

Charts

Weekly charts

Year-end charts

Certifications

Remix

Background and release
Doja Cat originally had a verse in the original, but it was later scrapped in favor of "Motive". A short snippet of the scrapped version was leaked and surfaced shortly after the album was released. On November 7, 2020, Doja Cat performed her verse during a live stream on Instagram.

Doja Cat first hinted at a  collaboration between her, Grande and Stallion on January 5, 2021. Eight days later, Grande teased a remix of "34+35" through a social media post of a short video of TV displaying the cover art with two then-unknown artists besides her. The next day, she revealed that the remix would feature American  rappers Doja Cat and Megan Thee Stallion. The singer also revealed the full cover art, featuring artists dressed as replicas of the fembots in the original "34+35" music video. The remix was officially released on January 15, 2021, alongside an accompanying lyric video that was based on the cover art. As the original version of the song was serviced to pop and hot AC radio stations, the remix was serviced to rhythmic radio on January 19, 2021. On February 12, alongside the music video premiere, a CD of "34+35 Remix" was released. That version of the song was announced to be included in the deluxe edition of Positions, which appeared a week later.

Composition and reception
"34+35 Remix" features a "sparkly" pop sound and sees Doja Cat and Megan Thee Stallion perform the second and third verses, respectively. Doja Cat's verse includes the notable line "I want that 69 without Tekashi", a reference to Tekashi69. In Megan's verse, she mentions streaming media apps Netflix and Hulu, DIY videos created on the video-sharing app YouTube, and coffeehouse chain Starbucks.

Bianca Betancourt of Harper's Bazaar wrote that the trio "does not disappoint" and that Doja Cat and Megan Thee Stallion "effortlessly float over their respective verses". Insiders Callie Ahlgrim dubbed the remix version as "cheeky".

Music video
On February 1, 2021, Grande teased a music video with two pictures posted to her social media. On February 5, Grande, Doja Cat and Megan all posted the same picture of them in lingerie to social media, hinting at a possible video. On February 9, Grande confirmed the music video and announced that it was scheduled for release on February 12, 2021. It was directed by Stefan Kohli.

The music video begins with Grande at a swimming pool reclining on a lawn chair reading a magazine while swans float by. The camera zooms out to reveal Doja Cat and Megan on two other lawn chairs. All acts later drink champagne. After Doja Cat's verse, Grande orders room service through an intercom. During her verse, Megan is twerking in a bathtub, and all the artists play around with a camcorder in bed. Grande is wearing Victoria's Secret Lace Plunge Teddy lingerie throughout most of the video.

Steffanie Wang of Nylon summarised that in the video all acts are "serving nothing but looks and aspirational lifestyle goals." Billboards Katie Atkinson called the video "perfect girls' day video."

Credits and personnel
 Ariana Grande – lead vocals, background vocals, engineering, vocal arrangement, vocal production
 Doja Cat – vocals
 Megan Thee Stallion – vocals
 Mr. Franks – co-production
 Tommy Brown –production
 Peter Lee Johnson – production, co-production, strings
 Courageous Xavier Herrera – co-production
 Billy Hickey – engineering
 Shawn "Source" Jarrett – engineering
 Şerban Ghenea – mix engineering
 Mike Dean – mix engineering
 Randy Merrill – master engineering

Charts

Certifications

Release history

See also
 List of Billboard Hot 100 top-ten singles in 2020
 List of Billboard Hot 100 top-ten singles in 2021

References

External links
 
 
 

2020 singles
2020 songs
Ariana Grande songs
Doja Cat songs
Megan Thee Stallion songs
Music videos directed by Director X
Republic Records singles
Song recordings produced by Tommy Brown (record producer)
Songs written by Ariana Grande
Songs written by Tayla Parx
Songs written by Tommy Brown (record producer)
Songs written by Victoria Monét